John Bourchier (1493 – ) was bishop-designate of Gloucester, England.

References

1493 births
1577 deaths
People of the Tudor period
16th-century English bishops
Bishops of Gloucester